Pakse (or Pakxe; French: Paksé; Laotian: ປາກເຊ  'mouth of the river') is the capital and most populous city of the southern Laotian province of Champasak, and the second most populous city in Laos. Located at the confluence of the Xe Don and Mekong Rivers, it has a population of about 95,000. Pakse was the capital of the Kingdom of Champasak until it was unified with the rest of Laos in 1946.

History
The French established an administrative outpost in Pakse in 1905. The city was the capital of the Lao Kingdom of Champasak until 1946 when the Kingdom of Laos was formed. After the Franco-Thai war the French ceded Preah Vihear Province, formerly belonging to the French protectorate of Cambodia, as well as the part of Champasak Province located on the other side of the Mekong river from Pakse, which had been part of Laos, to Thailand.

The city served as the primary seat and residence to Prince Boun Oum Na Champassak, an important figure in the Laotian Civil War. The prince began the construction of Champasak Palace, but fled in 1974 before it could be completed. The town fell to Pathet Lao forces in May 1975. After 1975, Pakse acquired substantial economic importance in the region. The construction of a bridge over the Mekong, built with Japanese aid, allows road traffic with Ubon Ratchathani in Thailand and has further connected the city to neighbouring countries.

Demographics
In 1943, 62 % of the population of Pakse were Vietnamese. Today, Pakse is home to many ethnic Chinese.

Religion

The population is predominantly Buddhist and the city has several temples. These include: Wat Luang, which was built in 1935 and is the largest temple in Pakse, and the Chinese temple Wat Sopsé. Pakse is also the seat of the Roman Catholic Apostolic Vicariate of Paksé led by Cardinal Louis-Marie Ling Mangkhanekhoun.

Culture
The city is the location of the Champasak Provincial Museum, which is a repository of historical documents and artifacts from the province.

Infrastructure

Health
There are two hospitals in the city. One is the second largest in Laos, but many citizens travel across the border to Thailand as Thai hospitals are better equipped. There is a high risk of malaria and dengue fever during the monsoon season.

Transportation

Road

Pakse is on National Road 13, the main transportation highway of Laos. It has bridges over the Xe Don, the French and the Russian Bridges, and one bridge over the Mekong River, the Lao Nippon Bridge, one of only five bridges over the Mekong in Laos.
Pakse is the gateway to the Bolaven Plateau, as well as to the southern provinces of Salavan, Sekong, and Attapeu.

Air
It is served by Pakse International Airport. Pakse Airport construction was completed on 2 November 2009, resuming flights to Vientiane, Siem Reap, Ho Chi Minh City and Bangkok.

Climate 

Pakse has a tropical savanna climate (Köppen climate classification Aw) with very warm temperatures throughout the year. Temperatures are especially high in the months before the monsoon season (March–April). There is a distinct wet season (April–October) and dry season (November–March).

Tourism
Pakse is growing as a tourist destination. Visitors to Pakse's Champasak Province have grown from 113,684 in 2006 to 493,180 in 2013. Sites of interest include:

Vat Phu
Si Phan Don

References

External links

Sabaidee Laos: Pakse (official tourism website)

Populated places in Champasak Province
Laos–Thailand border crossings
Populated places on the Mekong River
Provincial capitals in Laos